Tipped Off may refer to:

 Tipped Off (1920 film), American short silent Western film
 Tipped Off (1923 film), American silent drama film